The Burrum River is a river located in the Wide Bay-Burnett region of Queensland, Australia.

Course and features
The river rises within Lake Lenthall, impounded by Lenthalls Dam at the confluence of several smaller watercourses including Harwood Creek, Woolmer Creek and Duckinwilla Creek, near the town of Burrum. Below Lenthalls Dam the river is impounded by Burrum River Weir No.2 (built in 1951) and Burrum River Weir No.1 (built in 1900). The river flows in northerly direction and is crossed by the Bruce Highway near . The river flows past Pacific Haven before the Isis River joins with the Burrum River at the southern edge of the Burrum Coast National Park. Together with the Gregory River, it discharges into the Burrum Fish Habitat Area in Hervey Bay that flows out to the Coral Sea, at Burrum Heads. The river descends  over its  course. An estuary is formed at the mouth of the river. The area includes intensive inter-tidal flats, shallow sand banks, a meandering main channel with small patched of fringing mangroves.

The catchment area is generally low and flat and is situated between the Burnett and Mary River catchments.

Etymology
The river draws its name from the indigenous Australian Kabi language for a word meaning rocks interrupting river flow.

See also

References

Rivers of Queensland
Wide Bay–Burnett
Kabi Kabi